This is a list of frigates of Iran, which have served in the Imperial Iranian Navy and the Islamic Republic of Iran Navy.

Commissioned

Decommissioned

Future

References

Footnotes

Sources
 
 
 

Iran